Lipnica may refer to:

 Lipnica, Środa Śląska County in Lower Silesian Voivodeship, south-west Poland
 Lipnica, Wołów County in Lower Silesian Voivodeship, south-west Poland
 Lipnica, Kuyavian-Pomeranian Voivodeship, north-central Poland
 Lipnica, Lublin Voivodeship, east Poland
 Lipnica, Łódź Voivodeship, central Poland
 Lipnica, Świętokrzyskie Voivodeship, south-central Poland
 Lipnica, Subcarpathian Voivodeship, south-east Poland
 Lipnica, Słupca County in Greater Poland Voivodeship, west-central Poland
 Lipnica, Szamotuły County in Greater Poland Voivodeship, west-central Poland
 Lipnica, West Pomeranian Voivodeship, north-west Poland
 Lipnica, Radovljica, a village near Radovljica, Slovenia
 Lipnica (Kakanj), a village in the municipality of Kakanj, Bosnia and Herzegovina
 Lipnica, Tuzla, a village in the municipality of Tuzla, Bosnia and Herzegovina
 Lipnica (mountain) in Bosnia and Herzegovina
 Lipnica, Croatia, a village near Zagreb, Croatia
 Lipnica (Knić), a village in the municipality of Knić, Serbia
 Lipnica (Loznica), a village in municipality of Loznica, Serbia
 Leibnitz, Austria, a town in Styria that is called Lipnica in Slovenian